The Bayraktar Mini UAV is a miniature UAV produced by Turkish company Baykar.

Development

With the concept of short range day and night aerial reconnaissance and surveillance applications, system design activities started within 2004. Initial prototype Bayraktar A has been developed in 2005, and following successful autonomous flight demonstrations, Baykar has been awarded with a contract to start serial production. The first batch of the order by the Turkish Armed Forces was composed of 19 aircraft and they were mainly deployed to the Southeast parts of Turkey to be used in counterterrorism operations. After hundreds of hours flight trials and feed backs, system was subjected to major modifications and superior versions were started to developed. As a result, Bayraktar B Mini UAV Systems fielded and became operational in December 2007 to be initially operated by the Turkish Armed Forces. Due to its success in the region, the system was also awarded with an export deal to the Qatar Armed Forces in 2012. The developments over the aircraft is being continued. According to the company the most recent version Bayraktar MINI UAV D version has 2 times greater communication range and 3 times higher maximum altitude comparing to its predecessors.

Overview

Bayraktar-B is a hand-launched, portable UAV system, designed to operate under harsh geographic and meteorological conditions. Bayraktar-B is fielded with small army units, and as of 2021 have recorded more than 100,000 flight hours. System offers a complete autonomy with protective features with a high rank of reliability and easiness for the operators, which makes it a valuable technological asset.

Main features are:
 Automatic waypoint navigation
 Secure digital communication
 Home Return and automatic parachute landing in case of lost communication
 Smart battery management system
 Remote-range command/control and monitor (WAN Relay)
 Ground control switching
 Automatic take off
 Automatic cruising
 Automatic belly landing / parachute deployment
 Joystick assisted semi-automatic control
 Automatic stall control in case of electric motor dysfunction
 Automatic spin control in case of very harsh wind conditions
 Real-time Google Earth integration (display of telemetry data, routes etc. in real-time)
 On-screen video display
 Target coordinate estimation within 10 meters accuracy
 Automatic tracking antenna system
 Enhancing Situational Awareness by FLIR’s Tau Core

Operational history 
Bayraktar Mini UAS is operational since 2007.

Operators

Confirmed Operators Of Bayraktar Mini UAV 

  [2007]
 Turkish Armed Forces
  [2012]
 Army
  [2020]
 Army
  [2022]
 Army

Specifications

References

External links

 Mini UAV Company Web Site
 Bayraktar Mini UAV in military drill (Efes Drill 2010)

Unmanned military aircraft of Turkey
2000s Turkish military aircraft
V-tail aircraft
Single-engined pusher aircraft
Turkish military reconnaissance aircraft